Lake Placid vs. Anaconda is a 2015 American comedy horror television film directed by A.B. Stone, written by Berkeley Anderson and starring Corin Nemec, Yancy Butler and Robert Englund. The film premiered on April 25, 2015, on Syfy. It is a crossover between the Anaconda film series and Lake Placid film series, and the fifth installment in both their respective series. It is followed by Lake Placid: Legacy (2018).

Plot
After surviving the attack in Lake Placid: The Final Chapter, Jim Bickerman; due to his injuries, is left with an eye patch, hook and wooden leg. Working in Black Lake, Maine, with another mercenary named Beach, they capture a female giant crocodile. They take it back to their truck, where two scientists crossbreed its blood with a female giant anaconda to perfect a Blood Orchid serum. However, the crocodile escapes, killing a scientist, and freeing a female and two male anacondas before causing the truck to explode. The explosion destroys part of the electric fence keeping the crocodiles in Black Lake. Beach, Bickerman, and the one remaining scientist survive. A small group of crocodiles also escape.

The crocodiles search for food and one kills Daphne Mailer and her boyfriend, while another kills the remaining scientist, and multiple baby crocodiles kill a poacher. The crocodiles eventually make their way to nearby Clear Lake, along with the anacondas.

Reba, now the sheriff of Black Lake, calls U.S. Fish and Wildlife Service officer Will "Tully" Tull to help recapture the escaped crocodiles. Meanwhile, a group of college sorority girls from Delta Gamma, led by Tiffani and Amber, and two fraternity boys from Sigma Phi, Brett and Andrew, arrive at Clear Lake to initialize some new members, including Margo and Tully's daughter, Bethany.

The crocodiles feast upon sorority girls along with Amber (whom Tiffani pushes towards the crocodiles), Brett, Andrew, and Heather (the latter three who were wakeboarding). The survivors run into the forest to get to the cars. The girls left the keys on the beach, but the crocodiles attack the students. One of the girls, Cassie, runs out of Jennifer's car, try to escape, but a crocodile eats her. Tiffani's car is crushed by an anaconda with Jennifer still inside. A crocodile kills Tiffani and the others flee.

Deputy Ferguson discovers one of the surviving sorority girls hiding on a boat. The traumatized girl, Melissa, is taken to a hospital, while Tully and Reba continue to search for Bethany. Clear Lake is evacuated by Ferguson.

Sarah Murdoch, the sociopathic daughter of the late Peter "J.D." Murdoch and CEO of Wexel Hall Corporation in New York, leads a team of herself, Beach, Bickerman, and two mercenaries and go to capture the female anaconda before it lays its eggs, hoping to finish her father's work. One of the mercenaries is attacked by a crocodile, and Beach is forced to shoot them both.

Tully and Reba are attacked by a crocodile, which is in turn attacked by an anaconda, which crushes the crocodile until it explodes. The anaconda then escapes. Sarah's group steals a boat, but Bickerman falls off and is dragged underwater by a crocodile. After landing, the other mercenary is killed by an anaconda. Tully and Reba kill the other anaconda and rescue Bethany, Margo, and Jane. They regroup along with Ferguson until Sarah and Beach arrive. They discover two crocodiles eating a male anaconda. The female anaconda appears and kills a crocodile, and a crocodile flings the male anaconda into a helicopter containing Sarah's extraction team, causing it to crash. The female anaconda kills the crocodile and eats Beach alive, who sacrifices his life by detonating a grenade and killing the anaconda that swallowed him, devastating Sarah's chances of completing her father's project. Sarah is arrested and Bickerman, who survived, emerges from the lake, laughing maniacally. One last crocodile appears, but Reba and Tully quickly kill it.

In the nest of eggs laid by the female anaconda, one egg hatches to reveal a baby anaconda with crocodile-like attributes.

Cast
 Corin Nemec as Will "Tully" Tull
 Yancy Butler as Sheriff Reba, Sheriff of Black Lake
 Skye Lourie as Bethany Tull
 Robert Englund as Jim Bickerman
 Stephen Billington as Beach
 Annabel Wright as Sarah Murdoch
 Oliver Walker as Deputy Ferguson
 Natasha Jane Pyne as Daphne Mailer
 Laura Dale as Tiffani Jones
 Ali Eagle as Margo
 Heather Gilbert as Jane Goldsburg
 Georgina Philipps as Jennifer Bennett 
 Jenny May Darcy as Melissa
 Sophia Lorenti as Amber Casino
 Nigel Barber as The Mayor
 Charie Grant as Louise William

Production
Filming was scheduled to take place in Bulgaria in December 2013.

Reception

Tim Brayton of "Alternate Ending" gave it 2 out of 5.
Felix Vasquez of Cinema-crazed.com, despite low expectations, was not pleased by the film. He writes: "For the most part it succeeds in cheesy C grade "so bad it’s good" horror, with a lot of irritating characters getting their just deserts. I just wish there was more splatter to color the film along the way".

Home media
Lake Placid vs. Anaconda was released on DVD and digital on August 4, 2015.

See also
 List of killer crocodile films
 List of killer snake films

References

External links
 

 

2015 television films
2015 films
2015 horror films
2015 action thriller films
2010s comedy horror films
American action thriller films
American comedy horror films
American natural horror films
Direct-to-video sequel films
Horror crossover films
Fictional populated places in Maine
Films about fraternities and sororities
Films about fratricide and sororicide
Films about crocodilians
Films about snakes
Films set in Maine
Films set in New York City
Films set on beaches
Films shot in Bulgaria
Giant monster films
Lake Placid (film series)
Anaconda (film series)
Syfy original films
Sony Pictures direct-to-video films
Television sequel films
American horror television films
American drama television films
2010s English-language films
2010s American films